Sphagnum inundatum is a species of moss belonging to the family Sphagnaceae.

It has cosmopolitan distribution.

References

inundatum